Lehtimäki is a former municipality of Finland. It was consolidated to Alajärvi on 1 January 2009.

It is located in the province of Western Finland and is part of the Southern Ostrobothnia region. The municipality had a population of 1,850 (2006) and covered an area of 291.32 km² of which 18.88 km² is water. The population density was 7.2 inhabitants per km².

The municipality was unilingually Finnish.

References

External links 

Homepage of Lehtimäki

Populated places disestablished in 2009
2009 disestablishments in Finland
Former municipalities of Finland